Benjamin Howard Diggins (born June 13, 1979) is an American former professional baseball pitcher. He played in Major League Baseball (MLB) for the Milwaukee Brewers.

Amateur career
Diggins was drafted by the St. Louis Cardinals in the first round of the 1998 Major League Baseball Draft, but did not sign. He was later drafted by the Los Angeles Dodgers in the first round of the 2000 Major League Baseball Draft and signed on August 23, . He attended the University of Arizona where he was a Baseball America Freshman All-American in 1999 and a consensus All-American as a sophomore in 2000. As a starting pitcher Diggins was 10–4 with a 3.83 ERA and 127 strikeouts. He also hit for the Wildcats, batting .340 with 9 home runs and 41 RBIs. He played for the U.S.A National Baseball team the summer of 1999, where he led the team in saves (3) and ERA (2.05)

Professional career

Los Angeles Dodgers
He went 7–6 with a 3.58 ERA and 79 strikeouts in 21 games, all starts.

In  Diggins began the season with the Class-A Advanced Vero Beach Dodgers. He went 6–10 with a 3.63 ERA in 20 games, 19 starts.

Milwaukee Brewers
On July 23,  Diggins was traded by the Dodgers along with Shane Nance to the Milwaukee Brewers for Tyler Houston and a player to be named later, who eventually was Brian Mallette. He finished the season with the Double-A Huntsville Stars of the Southern League where he went 2–1 with a 1.91 ERA in seven games, all starts. Between the two organizations, Diggins went a combined 8–11 with a 3.20 ERA and 135 strikeouts in 151 innings pitched. Diggins was promoted to the Major Leagues and made his debut on September 2, 2002, against the Chicago Cubs. He started the game but only pitched 1, giving up eight runs, seven earned. In five games, all starts, Diggins went 0–4 with an 8.62 ERA in 24 innings pitched.

In  Diggins began the season with the Double-A Huntsville Stars going 3–2 with a 2.36 ERA, all starts, before tearing the UCL ligament in his elbow. He had season-ending Tommy John surgery in August 2003.

Houston Astros
On December 8,  Diggins was selected by the Houston Astros in the Rule 5 Draft but never made an appearance in their organization.

Windy City Thunderbolts
After being released by the Houston Astros, Diggins signed with the Independent Windy City Thunderbolts of the Frontier League as a first baseman. His transition soon led to his retirement. After just 17 games Diggins batted .209 with one home run and 9 RBIs.

References

External links

1979 births
Living people
Arizona League Brewers players
Arizona Wildcats baseball players
Baseball players from Kansas
Brevard County Manatees players
Huntsville Stars players
Los Angeles Angels scouts
Los Angeles Angels of Anaheim scouts
Major League Baseball pitchers
Milwaukee Brewers players
University of Arizona alumni
Vero Beach Dodgers players
Wilmington Waves players
Windy City ThunderBolts players
People from Wichita County, Kansas
Anchorage Glacier Pilots players